This is a list of notable Tamils.

Ancient Kings and Rulers

Tamil dynasties 
 Chola dynasty 
 Pandya dynasty 
 Chera dynasty
 Pallava dynasty
 Ay dynasty
 Velir dynasty
 Aryacakravarti dynasty
 Vanni dynasty
 Rajahnate of Cebu

Other royal families 
 Rulers of Ramnad
 Ramanatha Sethupathi (?–1979), last Raja of Ramnad estate
 Rajeswari Nachiyar, only daughter of last Raja Ramanatha Sethupathi, present titular ruler of Ramnad estate
 Rajkumar Sethupathi, actor, brother of last Raja Ramanatha Sethupathi and Latha, married leading actress in the 1980s Sripriya
 Latha, actress, sister of last Raja Ramanatha Sethupathi and actor Rajkumar Sethupathi
 Rulers of Pudukkottai
 Rajagopala Thondaiman (1922–1997), last ruler of the princely state of Pudukkottai
 R. Rajagopala Thondaiman (1958–?), present head of the royal house of Pudukkottai, son of Radhakrishna Thondaiman, nephew of last ruler Rajagopala Thondaiman
 Charubala Thondaiman (1958–), wife of R. Rajagopala Thondaiman, member of the INC, former mayor of Tiruchirappalli (2001–2009)

Governor-Generals, Presidents and Vice Presidents
 C. Rajagopalachari (1878–1972), Governor-General of India (1948–1950)
 S. Radhakrishnan (1888–1975), President of India (1962–1967) and Vice President of India (1952–1962)
 R. Venkataraman (1910–2009), President of India (1987–1992) and Vice President of India (1984–1987)
 Veerasamy Ringadoo (1920–2000), Governor-General of Mauritius (1986–1992)
 Veerasamy Ringadoo (1920–2000), President of Mauritius (1992–1992)
 A. P. J. Abdul Kalam (1931–2015), President of India (2002–2007)
 S. R. Nathan (1924–2016), President of Singapore (2002–2011)
 Angidi Veeriah Chettiar (1928–2010), Acting President of Mauritius (2002–2002)
 Ariranga Govindasamy Pillay (1945–), Acting President of Mauritius (2002–2002)
 Kamala Harris (1964–), Vice President of the United States (2021– present)

Prime Ministers 
 Moses Nagamootoo (1947–), Prime Minister of Guyana (2015–2020)

Multinational positions
 Radhika Coomaraswamy (1953–), Under-Secretary-General of the United Nations, Special Representative for Children and Armed Conflict
 James Appathurai (1968–), Deputy Assistant Secretary General for Political Affairs, Ex-spokesperson for NATO,
 Roy Padayachie (1950–2012), Minister of Public Service and Administration of the Republic of South Africa; also served in the economics desk of the ANC in KwaZulu-Natal and as deputy head of local government portfolio; consultant to UNICEF, UNESCO and the World Bank
 Sundar Pichai, CEO of Google
 Indra Nooyi, Indian-American business executive and former chairman and chief executive officer (CEO) of PepsiCo
 Raghuram Rajan, former IMF Chief Economist

Independence movement

Indian independence movement 
 Nagappan Padayatchi (1891 – 6 July 1909) 
 Maveeran Alagumuthu Kone (1710–1757)
 Puli Thevar (1715–1767)
 Marudhanayagam pillai (1725–1764)
 Veerapandiya kattabomman (1760–1799)
 Rani Velu Nachiar (1730–1796)
 Rettamalai Srinivasan (1860–1945)
 Dheeran Chinnamalai
 Subramanya Bharathi (1882–1921), poet and social reformer
 V. Kalyanasundaram (1883–1953), scholar
 Subramaniya Siva (1884–1925), writer
 Jeevanandham (1907–1963)
 Champakaraman Pillai (1891–1934)
 Tiruppur Kumaran (1904–1932)
 K. Kamaraj (1903–1975)
 Veeran Sundaralingam (1770–1799)
 Pasumpon Muthuramalinga Thevar (30 October 1908 - 30 October 1963)

Independence movements in other countries 

 Velupillai Prabhakaran (1954–2009), founder and leader of Liberation Tigers of Tamil Eelam, fighting for independent Tamil state in Sri Lanka, Tamil Eelam
 Thillaiaadi Valliammai (1898–1914), South African militant
 Captain Miller (1966–1987), Tamil rebel and member of the Tamil Tigers, a separatist Tamil militant organisation in Sri Lanka; known as the LTTE's first Black Tiger (suicide bomber).
 V. T. Sambanthan (1919–1979), one of the three founding fathers of Malaysia
 Pon Sivakumaran (1950–1974), Eelam Tamil rebel and the first Tamil militant to commit suicide by swallowing cyanide
 Ponnambalam Ramanathan, leader in the Sri Lankan independence movement
 Ponnambalam Arunachalam, leader in the Sri Lankan independence movement
 Cankili I also known as Cekaracacekaran VII, most remembered Jaffna kingdom king in the Eelam Tamil history. He was very active in resisting Portuguese colonial inroads into Eelam. 
 Cankili II, known as the last King of the Jaffna Kingdom
 Arumaipperumal, Batticaloa chieftain in the 18th century who led a rebellion against the British colonial occupiers in 1803
 Pandara Vanniyan (1775–1810), Tamil Chieftain who ruled in Vanni Nadu in 18th century AD. He is referred to by some as the last Tamil king in Sri Lanka, who also rose to revolt against the British Ceylon empire and Dutch Ceylon empire, who died battling the British colonial rule on the island.
 Periyapillai, known to mount the major attack on the Portuguese fort in the Mannar Island to regain territory lost during Cankili's rule
 Migapulle Arachchi also known as Chinna Migapillai, feudal lord from the Jaffna Kingdom who became a rebel leader just after its annexation by the Portuguese Empire in 1619. His title Arachchi, is a title given to the commanders of Lascarins or native military forces.
 Varunakulattan, 17th-century feudal lord and military commander from the Jaffna Kingdom. He led a rebellion as the military commander of Thanjavur Nayak against the Portuguese in their conquest of the Jaffna kingdom in 1619. Although the nominal king was Cankili II, Varunakulattan was described as the king of Karaiyars, and wield the real power in the Jaffna Peninsula.
 Puviraja Pandaram
 Kasi Nayinar Pararacacekaran
 Ethirimana Cinkam

Contributions to Tamil people
 Marshal Nesamony (1895–1968), responsible for Kanyakumari district merger with Tamil Nadu
 Varadarajan Mudaliar (1926–1988), known as Vardha Bhai; the Tamil movie Nayakan was based on his life story
Thamizhavel G. Sarangapani, Singaporean Tamil pioneer

Governors of states 
 C. Rajagopalachari (1878–1972), Governor of West Bengal (1947–1948)
 P. S. Kumaraswamy Raja (1898–1957), Governor of Odisha (1954–1956)
 Jothi Venkatachalam (1917–unknown), Governor of Kerala (1977–1982)
 P. Ramachandran (1921–2001), Governor of Kerala (1982–1988)
 T. V. Rajeswar (1926–2018), Governor of Sikkim (1985–1989), West Bengal (1989–1990) and Uttar Pradesh (2004–2009)
 C. Rangarajan (1932–), Governor of Andhra Pradesh (1997–2003)
 Sasindran Muthuvel (1974–), Governor for West New Britain Province (2012–incumbent)
 E. S. L. Narasimhan (1945–), Governor of Chhattisgarh (2007–2010), Andhra Pradesh (2007–2019) and Telangana (2014–2019)
 P. Sathasivam (1949–), Governor of Kerala (2014–2019)
 V. Shanmuganathan (1949–), Governor of Manipur (2015–2016), Meghalaya (2015–2017) and Arunachal Pradesh (Additional charge) (2016–2017)
 Tamilisai Soundararajan (1961–), Governor of Telangana (2019–Incumbent)
 La. Ganesan (1945–), Governor of Manipur (2021–2023), West Bengal (Additional charge) (2022) and Nagaland (2023–Incumbent)
 C. P. Radhakrishnan (1957–), Governor of Jharkhand (2023–Incumbent)

Lieutenant Governors of union territories 
 Tamilisai Soundararajan (1961–), Lieutenant Governor of Puducherry (Additional charge) (2021–Incumbent)

Chief Ministers
 C. V. Vigneswaran (1939–), Chief Minister of Northern province of Sri Lanka (2013–2018)
 S. Chandrakanthan (1975–), Chief Minister of Eastern province of Sri Lanka (2008–2012)
 P. Subbarayan (1889–1962), Chief Minister of Madras Presidency (1926–1930)
 P. T. Rajan (1892–1974), Chief Minister of Madras Presidency (1936–1936)
 C. Rajagopalachari (1878–1972), Chief Minister of Madras Presidency (1947–1949) and Tamil Nadu (1952–1954)
 Omanthur P. Ramaswamy Reddiar (1895–1970), Chief Minister of Madras Presidency (1947–1949)
 P. S. Kumaraswamy Raja (1898–1957), Chief Minister of Madras Presidency (1949–1950) and Tamil Nadu (1950–1952)
 K. Kamaraj (1903–1975), Chief Minister of Tamil Nadu (1954–1963)
 M. Bhakthavatsalam (1897–1987), Chief Minister of Tamil Nadu (1963–1967)
 V. Venkatasubba Reddiar (1909–1982), Chief Minister of Puducherry (1964–1967; 1968–1968)
 C. N. Annadurai (1909–1969), Chief Minister of Tamil Nadu (1967–1969)
 V. R. Nedunchezhiyan (1920–2000), Chief Minister of Tamil Nadu (1969–1969; 1987–1988)
 M. Karunanidhi (1924–2018), Chief Minister of Tamil Nadu (1969–1976; 1989–1991; 1996–2001; 2006–2011)
 S. Ramassamy (1939–2017), Chief Minister of Puducherry (1974–1974; 1977–1978) 
 M. G. Ramachandran (1917–1987), Chief Minister of Tamil Nadu (1977–1987)
 V. N. Janaki Ramachandran (1924–1996), Chief Minister of Tamil Nadu (1988–1988)
 J. Jayalalithaa (1948–2016), Chief Minister of Tamil Nadu (1991–1996; 2001–2001; 2002–2006; 2011–2014; 2015–2016)
 V. Vaithilingam (1950–), Chief Minister of Puducherry (1991–1996; 2008–2011)
 P. Shanmugam (1927–2013), Chief Minister of Puducherry (2000–2001)
 O. Panneerselvam (1951–), Chief Minister of Tamil Nadu (2001–2002; 2014–2015; 2016–2017)
 N. Rangasamy (1950–), Chief Minister of Puducherry (2001–2008; 2011–2016; 2021–Incumbent)
 V. Narayanasamy (1947–), Chief Minister of Puducherry (2016–2021)
 Edappadi K. Palaniswami (1954–), Chief Minister of Tamil Nadu (2017–2021)
 M. K. Stalin (1953–), Chief Minister of Tamil Nadu (2021–Incumbent)

Deputy Chief Ministers
 M. K. Stalin (1953–), Deputy Chief Minister of Tamil Nadu (2009–2011)
 O. Panneerselvam (1951–), Deputy Chief Minister of Tamil Nadu (2017–2021)

Union Ministers 
 R. K. Shanmukham Chetty (1892–1953), Minister of Finance (1947–1948)
 N. Gopalaswami Ayyangar (1882–1953), Minister of Defence (1952–1953)
 K. Santhanam (1895–1980), Minister of State for Transport and Railways (1948–1952)
 C. Rajagopalachari (1878–1972), Minister of Home Affairs (1950–1951)
 P. Subbarayan (1889–1962), Minister of Transport and Communications (1959–1962)
 C. Subramaniam (1910–2000), Minister of Defence (1979–1980)
 Mohan Kumaramangalam (1916–1973), Minister of Steel and Mines (1971–1973)
 Sathiavani Muthu (1923–1999), Minister of Social Welfare (1979–1979)
 A. Bala Pajanor (1935–2013), Minister of Petroleum, Chemicals and Fertilizers (1979–1979)
 P. Chidambaram (1945–), Minister of Finance (2012–2014)
 Murasoli Maran (1934–2003), Minister of Commerce and Industry (1999–2002)
 Subramanian Swamy (1939–), Minister of Commerce, Law and Justice (1990–1991)
 M. Arunachalam (1944–2004), Minister of Chemicals and Fertilizers (1997–1998)
 T. R. Baalu (1941–), Minister of Shipping, Road Transport and Highways (2004–2009)
 P. R. Kumaramangalam (1952–2000), Minister of Power (1998–2000)
 R. Muthiah (1945–), Minister of Surface Transport (1998–1998)
 M. Thambidurai (1947–), Minister of Law, Justice, Company Affairs and Surface Transport (1998–1999)
 R. K. Kumar (1942–1999), Minister of State for Parliamentary Affairs and Finance (1998–1998)
 Kadambur M. R. Janarthanan (1929–2020), Minister of State for Personnel, Public Grievances, Pensions and Finance (1998–1999)
 K. Ramamurthy (1940–2002), Minister of Petroleum and Natural Gas (1998–1999)
 Gingee N. Ramachandran (1944–), Minister of State for Textiles (2003–2003)
 A. Raja (1963–), Minister of Communications and Information Technology (2009–2010)
 Pon Radhakrishnan (1952–), Minister of State for Finance (2017–2019)
 K. Jana Krishnamurthy (1928–2007), Minister of Law and Justice (2002–2003)
 A. K. Moorthy (1964–), Minister of State for Railways (2002–2004)
 M. K. Alagiri (1951–), Minister of Chemicals and Fertilizers (2009–2013)
 G. K. Vasan (1964–), Minister of Shipping (2009–2014)
 Anbumani Ramadoss (1968–), Minister of Health and Family Welfare (2004–2009)
 Mani Shankar Aiyar (1941–), Minister of Panchayati Raj (2004–2009)
 S. S. Palanimanickam (1950–), Minister of State for Finance (2004–2013)
 K. Venkatapathy (1947–), Minister of State for Law and Justice (2004–2009)
 Subbulakshmi Jagadeesan (1947–), Minister of State for Social Justice and Empowerment (2004–2009)
 R. Velu (1940–), Minister of State for Railways (2004–2009)
 S. Regupathy (1950–), Minister of State for Environment and Forests (2007–2009)
 Dayanidhi Maran (1966–), Minister of Textiles (2009–2011)
 V. Radhika Selvi (1976–), Minister of State for Home Affairs (2007–2009)
 D. Nepoleon (1963–), Minister of State for Social Justice and Empowerment (2009–2013)
 S. Jagathrakshakan (1950–), Minister of State for Commerce and Industry (2012–2013)
 V. Narayanasamy (1947–), Minister of State for Personnel, Public Grievances and Pensions (2010–2014)
 Nirmala Sitharaman (1959–), Minister of Finance and Corporate Affairs (2019–Incumbent)
 S. Jaishankar (1955–), Minister of External Affairs (2019–Incumbent)
 L. Murugan (1977–), Minister of State for Fisheries, Animal Husbandry, Dairying, Information and Broadcasting (2021–Incumbent)

Political leaders outside of India 
 Moses Veerasammy Nagamootoo (1947–), Prime Minister, Guyana
 Jeanne Dupleix, (1706-1756), French political advisor
 Abdul Razak (1898-1947), Burmese politician
 S. Jayakumar (1939–), former Deputy Prime Minister, Singapore
 Tharman Shanmugaratnam (1957–), Deputy Prime Minister and Minister for Finance, Singapore
 Vivian Balakrishnan (1961–), Minister of Community Development, Youth and Sports, Singapore
 S. Rajaratnam (1915–2006), former Deputy Prime Minister, Singapore
 S. Dhanabalan (1937–), former Minister (various portfolios), Singapore
 J. B. Jeyaretnam (1926–2008), ex-opposition leader and MP, Singapore
 Ramasamy Palanisamy (1949–), Deputy Chief Minister of Penang state, Malaysia
 Tommy Thomas, barrister and former Attorney General of Malaysia
 K. S. Rajah, Senior Counsel and former Judicial Commissioner of the Supreme Court of Singapore
 Nagalingam Shanmugathasan (1920–1993), founding General Secretary of the Ceylon Communist Party, Sri Lanka
 Bala Tampoe (1922–2014), Tamil trade unionist, Sri Lanka
 Pillayan alias Sivanesathurai Chandrakanthan (1975–), former Chief Minister of Eastern Province, Sri Lanka
 P. P. Devaraj (1929–), former Cabinet Minister of Sri Lanka
 Radhakrishnan, Deputy Minister for Industry Affairs of Sri Lanka
 Visvanathan Rudrakumaran, Prime Minister of the Transnational Government of Tamil Eelam
 Samy Vellu (1937–2022), former Works Minister and Leader of Malaysian Indian Congress, Malaysia
 K. R. Somasundram (1930–), politician and member of Malaysian Indian Congress, Malaysia
 Joshua Benjamin Jeyaretnam (1926–2008), founder of Reform Party of Singapore
 Radhakrishna Padayachi (1950–2012), Deputy Minister for Communication, Republic of South Africa
 Rathika Sitsabaiesan (1981–), Member of Parliament, Canada
 Gunasagaran Gounder, prominent politician and a member of Fiji Labour Party, Fiji
 Perumal Mupnar, prominent politician and a member of Fiji Labour Party, Fiji
 S. J. V. Chelvanayakam (1898–1977), leader and father figure of Sri Lankan Tamils
 Savumiamoorthy Thondaman (1913–1999), leader of Indian Tamils of Sri Lanka and had served the Sri Lankan Cabinet
 N. Shanmugathasan (1920–1993), prominent Communist politician, Sri Lanka
 Joseph Pararajasingham (1934–2005), Member of Parliament, Sri Lanka
 Lakshman Kadirgamar (1932–2005), former Foreign Minister, Sri Lanka
 Veerasingham Anandasangaree (1933–), Member of Parliament, Sri Lanka
 Murugesu Sivasithamparam (1923–2002), Member of Parliament, Sri Lanka
 Rajavarothiam Sampanthan (1933–), Member of Parliament, Sri Lanka
 Dr. Neelan Tiruchelvam (1944–1999), Member of Parliament, Sri Lanka
 Appapillai Amirthalingam (1927–1989), leader of the opposition, Parliament of Sri Lanka
 Douglas Devananda (1957–), leader of EPDP and Minister of Rehabilitation, Sri Lanka
 Thamizhavel G. Sarangapani (1903–1974), Tamil journalist, writer, publisher, social activist
 Patrick Pillay, Minister of External Affairs of the Seychelles
 Jean-Paul Virapoullé (1944–), member of the Senate of France, representing the island of Réunion
 Raja Krishnamoorthi (1973–), American congressman 
 E. E. C. Thuraisingham (1898–1979), first local Member in British-ruled Malaya
 Maya Harris, Vice President for Democracy, Rights and Justice at the Ford Foundation and executive director of the American Civil Liberties Union (ACLU) of Northern California.
 Vanushi Walters, New Zealand lawyer, politician and Member of Parliament in the House of Representatives for the Labour Party representing the Upper Harbour electorate

Governors of the Reserve Bank of India
 S. Venkitaramanan, 18th Governor of the Reserve Bank of India
 C. Rangarajan, 19th Governor of the Reserve Bank of India
 Raghuram Rajan, 23rd Governor of the Reserve Bank of India

Political families

Tamil Nadu

C. Rajagopalachari family
 C. Rajagopalachari (1878–1972), Former Governor-General of India
 C. R. Narasimhan (1909–1989), Former Member of Parliament (Lok Sabha); son of Rajagopalachari

C.P. Ramaswami Iyer family
 C. P. Ramaswami Iyer (1879–1966), Former Dewan of Travancore
 C. P. R. Pattabhiraman (1906–2001), Former Union Minister of Law and Company Affairs; son of Ramaswami Iyer

D. Jayakumar family
 D. Jayakumar (1960–), Former Speaker of Tamil Nadu Legislative Assembly
  J. Jayavardhan (1987–), Former Member of Parliament (Lok Sabha); son of Jayakumar

E. V. K. Sampath family
 E. V. K. Sampath (1926–1977), Former Member of Parliament (Lok Sabha)
 E. V. K. S. Elangovan (1948–), Former Union Minister of State in the Ministry of Textiles; son of E. V. K. Sampath

G. K. Moopanar family
 G. K. Moopanar (1931–2001), Former Member of Parliament (Rajya Sabha)
 G. K. Vasan (1964–), Former Union Minister of Shipping; son of Moopanar

H. Kumari Ananthan family
 H. Kumari Ananthan (1933–), Former Member of Parliament (Lok Sabha)
 Tamilisai Soundararajan (1961–), Governor of Telangana; daughter of Kumari Ananthan
 H. Vasanthakumar (1950–2020), Former Member of Parliament (Lok Sabha); brother of Kumari Ananthan
 Vijay Vasanth (1983–), Member of Parliament (Lok Sabha); nephew of Kumari Ananthan

M. Bhakthavatsalam family
 M. Bhakthavatsalam (1897–1987), Former Chief Minister of Tamil Nadu
 Jayanthi Natarajan (1954–), Former Union Minister of Environment and Forests; granddaughter of Bhakthavatsalam

M. Karunanidhi family
 M. Karunanidhi (1924–2018), Former Chief Minister of Tamil Nadu
 M. K. Alagiri (1951–), Former Union Minister of Chemicals and Fertilizers; son of Karunanidhi
 M. K. Stalin (1953–), Chief Minister of Tamil Nadu; son of Karunanidhi
 Kanimozhi Karunanidhi (1968–), Member of Parliament (Lok Sabha); daughter of Karunanidhi
 Dayanidhi Alagiri (unknown–), Indian cinema producer; grandson of Karunanidhi
 Udhayanidhi Stalin (1977–), Member of Legislative Assembly (Tamil Nadu); grandson of Karunanidhi
 Arulnithi Tamilarasu (1987–), Indian actor; grandson of Karunanidhi
 Murasoli Maran (1934–2003), Former Union Minister of Commerce and Industry; nephew of Karunanidhi
 Kalanithi Maran (1964–), Founder of the Sun Group; grand-nephew of Karunanidhi
 Dayanidhi Maran (1966–), Former Union Minister of Communications and Information Technology; grand-nephew of Karunanidhi

An M. G. Ramachandran family
 M. G. Ramachandran (1917–1987), Former Chief Minister of Tamil Nadu
 V. N. Janaki Ramachandran (1924–1996), Former Chief Minister of Tamil Nadu; wife of Ramachandran
 M. G. Chakrapani (1911–1986), Indian actor; brother of Ramachandran

An O. Panneerselvam family
 O. Panneerselvam (1951–), Former Chief Minister and Deputy Chief Minister of Tamil Nadu
  P. Ravindhranath (1980–), Member of Parliament (Lok Sabha); son of Panneerselvam

P. Subbarayan family
 P. Subbarayan (1889–1962), Former Union Minister of Transport and Communications
 Mohan Kumaramangalam (1916–1973), Former Union Minister of Steel and Mines; son of Subbarayan
 Parvathi Krishnan (1919–2014), member of the Communist Party of India; daughter of Subbarayan
 Rangarajan Kumaramangalam (1952–2000), Former Member of Parliament (Lok Sabha); grandson of Subbarayan
 Rangarajan Mohan Kumaramangalam (1978–), member of the Indian National Congress; great-grandson of Subbarayan
 Lalitha Kumaramangalam (1957–), member of the National Executive of the BJP; granddaughter of P. Subbarayan

P. T. Rajan family
 P. T. Rajan (1892–1974), Former Chief Minister of Madras Presidency
 P. T. R. Palanivel Rajan (1932–2006), Former Speaker of the Tamil Nadu Legislative Assembly; son of P.T. Rajan
 P. T. R. Palanivel Thiagarajan, Finance Minister of Tamil Nadu; grandson of P.T. Rajan

Sri Lanka

Arumugampillai Coomaraswamy family
 Arumugampillai Coomaraswamy (1783–1836), Gate Mudaliyar, Member of Legislative Council
 Muthu Coomaraswamy (1833–1879), Member of Legislative Council, son of Arumugampillai Coomaraswamy
 Ananda Coomaraswamy (1877–1947), grandson of Arumugampillai Coomaraswamy

Arunachalam Ponnambalam family
 Arunachalam Ponnambalam (1814–1887), son in law of Arumugampillai Coomaraswamy
 P. Coomaraswamy  (1849–1906), first son of Arunachalam Ponnambalam
 P. Ramanathan (1851–1930), second son of Arunachalam Ponnambalam
 Arunachalam Mahadeva  (1885–1969), son of P. Ramanathan
 Baku Mahadeva (1921–2013), grandson of P. Ramanathan
 P. Arunachalam (1853–1924), third son of Arunachalam Ponnambalam

S. Pararajasingam family
 S. Pararajasingam, senator, son in law of P. Arunachalam, married Pathmavathy (daughter of P. Arunachalam)

V. P. Ganeshan family
 V. P. Ganeshan, founder of the Democratic Workers' Congress, film producer and actor
 Mano Ganesan (1959–), Member of Parliament, Provincial Councillor, son of V.P. Ganeshan
 Praba Ganesan (1964–), Member of Parliament, Provincial Councillor, son of V.P. Ganeshan

Savumiamoorthy Thondaiman family
 Savumiamoorthy Thondaiman (1913–1999), founder and leader of the Ceylon Workers' Congress, government minister, Member of Parliament 
 Arumugam Thondaiman (1964–), leader of the Ceylon Workers' Congress, Member of Parliament, grandson of Savumiamoorthy Thondaiman

G. G. Ponnambalam family
 G. G. Ponnambalam (1901–1977), founder and leader of the All Ceylon Tamil Congress, government minister, Member of Parliament, Member of State Council
 Kumar Ponnambalam (1940–2000), former leader of the All Ceylon Tamil Congress, presidential candidate (1982), son of G.G. Ponnambalam
 Gajendrakumar Ponnambalam (1974–), present leader of the All Ceylon Tamil Congress, son of Kumar Ponnambalam, grandson of G.G. Ponnambalam

Arumugam Canagaratnam family
 Arumugam Canagaratnam (1873–1929), Member of Legislative Council
 Cathiravelu Sittampalam (1898–1964), government minister, Member of Parliament, son of A. Cathiravelu, nephew of A.Canagaratnam
 Cathiravelu Ponnambalam, first mayor of Jaffna, son of A. Cathiravelu, nephew of A. Canagaratnam

Military leaders

Army 
 General Paramasiva Prabhakar Kumaramangalam (1913–2000), 7th Chief of Army Staff (1966–1969)
 General Krishnaswamy Sundararajan (1930–1999), 14th Chief of Army Staff (1986–1988)
 General Sundararajan Padmanabhan (1940–), 19th Chief of Army Staff (2000–2002)

Navy 
 Admiral Oscar Stanley Dawson (1923–2011), 12th Chief of Naval Staff, India, 1982–1984
 Admiral Sushil Kumar (1940–2019), 16th Chief of the Naval Staff (India) (1988–2001)
 Vice Admiral Nilkanta Krishnan (1919–1982), Commanding-in-Chief of the Eastern Naval Command, India, 1947–1976
 Rear Admiral Rajan Kadiragamar, 2nd Ceylonese Captain of the Royal Ceylon Navy
 Admiral Travis Sinniah, 21st Commander of the Sri Lankan Navy

Air Force 
 Air Chief Marshal Srinivasapuram Krishna Swamy (1943–), 19th Chief of Air Staff (2001–2004)

Independence Movement

 Velupillai Prabhakaran, founder of Liberation Tigers of Tamil Eelam
 Vaithilingam Sornalingam, also known as Colonel Shanker, was founder of the air wing and marine division of the Liberation Tigers of Tamil Eelam
 Ambalavanar Neminathan commonly known by the nom de guerre Raju) was a leading member of the Tamil Tigers, Raju served as the head of the LTTE's Engineering Corps. He was special commander of the Leopard Commandos, an infantry unit, and chief technical officer in the Kittu Regiment, the LTTE's artillery unit which Raju helped create. 
 Pottu Amman, was the second-in-command of Tamil Tigers. was a Head of Tiger Organization Security Intelligence Service and the Black Tigers.
 Lt. Colonel Thileepan

Award winners

Nobel Prize winners 

 C. V. Raman, Nobel Prize in Physics, 1930
 Subrahmanyan Chandrasekhar, Nobel Prize in Physics, 1983
 Venkatraman Ramakrishnan, Nobel Prize in Chemistry, 2009

Fields Medal 
 Akshay Venkatesh, Fields Medal in mathematics, 2018

Bharat Ratna 
The Bharat Ratna, India's highest civilian honor
 C. Rajagopalachari, Former Governor-General of the Republic of India, 1954
 Sarvepalli Radhakrishnan, Former President of the Republic of India, 1954
 C. V. Raman, Indian physicist, 1954
 K. Kamaraj, Former Chief Minister of Tamil Nadu, 1976
 M. G. Ramachandran, Former Chief Minister of Tamil Nadu, 1988
 A. P. J. Abdul Kalam, Former President of the Republic of India, 1997
 M. S. Subbulakshmi, Indian singer, 1998
 C. Subramaniam, Former Minister of Defence of the Republic of India, 1998

Padma Vibhushan 
The Padma Vibhushan is India's second highest civilian honour.
 Arcot Lakshmanaswami Mudaliar, for Medicine, 1963
 Subrahmanyan Chandrasekhar, for Science & Engineering, 1968
 K. V. Kalyana Sundaram, for Public Affairs, 1968
 Arcot Ramasamy Mudaliar, for Civil Service, 1970
 T. Swaminathan, for Civil Service, 1973
 T. Balasaraswati, for Arts, 1977
 V. Arunachalam, for Literature & Education, 1990
 Raja Jesudoss Chelliah, for Public Affairs, 2007
 Balu Sankaran, for Medicine, 2007
 V. Krishnamurthy, for Civil Service, 2007
 [[Ilaiyaraaj
a]], for Music, 2018
Rajinikanth arts

Padma Bhushan 
The Padma Bhushan is India's third highest civilian honour.

 Sivaji Ganesan, 1984
 Kamal Haasan, Arts
 Ilaiyaraaja, veteran musician and Tamil music director
 A. R. Rahman, Oscar-winning musician from Chennai; referred to as the Mozart of Madras
 Arogyaswami Paulraj, wireless technology pioneer
 Shiv Nadar, Indian industrialist and philanthropist
 Jayakanthan, author
 Muthulakshmi Reddy, doctor, social reformer
 Krishnammal Jaganathan, Social Service
Rajinikanth Arts

Padma Shri 
The Padma Shri is India's fourth highest civilian honour.
 Sivaji Ganesan (1966), Arts
 K. Balachander (1987), Arts
 Vairamuthu (2003), Literature and Education
 B. Palaniappan (2006), Medicine
 Sivanthi Adithan (2008), Literature and Education
 Vivek (2009), Arts
 Mecca Rafeeque Ahmed (2011), businessman and entrepreneur

Ramon Magsaysay Award 
The Ramon Magsaysay Award was established in 1957 in memory of Ramon Magsaysay, the late president of the Philippines. It is often considered to be Asia's Nobel Prize.
 M. S. Swaminathan, for Community Leadership, 1971
 M. S. Subbulakshmi, for classical carnatic genre, 1974
 Jockin Arputham, for Peace and International Understanding, 2000
 Kulandei Francis, 2012
 T. M. Krishna, 2016

Dadasaheb Phalke Award 
The Dadasaheb Phalke Award is India's highest award in cinema, given annually by the Government of India for lifetime contribution to Indian cinema. It was instituted in 1969, the birth centenary year of Dadasaheb Phalke, considered as the father of Indian cinema.
 Sivaji Ganesan, 1996
 K. Balachander, 2011

Param Vir Chakra 
The Param Vir Chakra is India's highest military honor.

 Major Ramaswamy Parmeshwaran (1946–1987), awarded in 1987 (posthumous) for IPKF operations in Sri Lanka

Sahitya Akademi Award

Major Dhyan Chand Khel Ratna Award
The Major Dhyan Chand Khel Ratna Award is India's highest sporting honor.

 Viswanathan Anand, for Chess, 1991–92
 Dhanraj Pillai, for Men's field hockey, 1999–2000
 Mariyappan Thangavelu, for Paralympic high jump, 2020–2021

Jnanpith Award 
The Jnanpith Award is India's highest literary honor

 Akilan, 1975
 Jayakanthan, 2002

Sangeet Natak Akademi Award 
 Vyjayanthimala, Sangeet Natak Akademi, 1982

Sangeet Natak Akademi Fellowship 
 Karaikudi Sambasiva Iyer
 Ariyakudi Ramanuja Iyengar
 Papanasam R. Sivan
 V. Raghavan

Guinness World Records 
 L. Athira Krishna, Guinness World Record holder
 Suresh Joachim, Canadian actor, producer, and multiple-Guinness World Record holder
 V. S. Kumar Anandan, his many records include swimming the Palk Strait, from Sri Lanka to India and back in 51 hours, in 1971
 Kutraleeswaran, swam across English Channel in 1994 when he was just 13 years old; the same year, he swam across six channels to break Mihir Sen's record of swimming across five channels in a calendar year
 Rajasekharan Parameswaran, Guinness World Records holder. 
Aari Arujunan, actor and Guinness World Record holder

Arjuna Award

The Arjuna Award was instituted in 1961 by the Government of India to recognize outstanding achievement in national sports.
 Kutraleeswaran, youngest Arjuna Award winner

Oscar awards 
 A. R. Rahman, won the Academy Award for Best Original Score and Academy Award for Best Original Song in 2009
 Cottalango Leon, won the Academy Award for scientific and technical achievement "the design, engineering and continuous development"[a] of Sony Pictures Imageworks itView technology in 2016

Social workers
 Pandit Iyothee Thass, Anti-caste activist, founding father of dravidian movement and first buddhist revivalist of India
M. B. Nirmal, founder and chairman of Exnora International
 Suresh Joachim, founder and chairman of World Peace Marathon 
 Krishnammal Jagannathan 
 Naraina Pillai
 Anjali Gopalan, first Indian Tamil woman awarded with the Chevalier de la Légion d'honneur, "Knight in the order of the legions of Honor", the highest award from France, 2013
 Harish Iyer, Mumbai based blogger and LGBT rights activist
 Chinna Pillai, started Kalanjiam, a microcredit movement in villages
 Traffic Ramasamy, self-appointed traffic policeman, public interest litigator and social activist from Chennai
 Kumi Naidoo, Secretary General of Amnesty international
Rettamalai Srinivasan, Dalit activist

Criminals 
 Bentong Kali (1961–1993), was a Malaysian-Tamil criminal and mobster who gained a national attention in the 1990s. He was implicated in over 17 different murders, and terrorized the capital Kuala Lumpur through violence, extortion and heroin smuggling. He also made headlines when he challenged the police to arrest him. He was finally gunned down by Royal Malaysia Police's Special Actions Unit from Bukit Aman, Kuala Lumpur.
 Douglas Devananda (1957-) is a paramilitary leader, politician and a proclaimed offender in India and is wanted on charges of murder, attempt to murder, child prostitution, rioting, unlawful assembly and kidnapping. Liberation Tigers of Tamil Eelam (Tamil Tigers), tried unsuccessfully to assassinate him over 10 times.
 Varadarajan Mudaliar (1926–1988), also known as Vardhabhai and Vardha, was an Indian-Tamil crime boss. He was one of the infamous trio of mafia gang leaders of Mumbai the other being Karim Lala and Haji Mastan. His origin is North Arcot district of Tamil Nadu, from where his father migrated to Tuticorin to work in shipping business. He was born in Tuticorin, Tamil Nadu. From early 1960s to the 1980s; he was one of the most powerful mob bosses in Bombay, along with Haji Mastan and Karim Lala.
 Auto Shankar (1954–1995), was a serial killer and a gangster from the state of Tamil Nadu active in Chennai throughout the 1970s and 1980s.

Business and administration

Tamil billionaires 
 Ananda Krishnan
 Kalanithi Maran
 Shiv Nadar
 Ram Shriram
 A. Vellayan
 Maha Sinnathamby
 G. Gnanalingam
 R. G. Chandramogan
 Sundar Pichai
 B. S. Abdur Rahman 
 T. S. Kalyanaraman
 Subaskaran Allirajah
 Sridhar Vembu

Tamil executives and business people

 Palani G. Periasamy, Chairman of PGP Group of companies
 Indra Krishnamurthy Nooyi, former chairman and CEO of PepsiCo
 Sundar Pichai, CEO of Google, Inc.
 Neal Mohan, CEO of Youtube
 Vasant Narasimhan, CEO of Novartis 
 Revathi Advaithi, CEO of Flex
 Ronald Arculli, Chairman of Hong Kong Exchanges and Clearing and Non-official Members Convenor of the Executive Council of Hong Kong (Exco)
 Prabhakar Raghavan, Senior vice President of Google Inc.
 Kalanidhi Maran, founder and head of Sun TV Network; ex-owner of SpiceJet Airline and owner of Sunrisers Hyderabad IPL team
 Natarajan Chandrasekaran, Chairman of Tata & Sons
 Subramaniam Ramadorai, adviser, Prime Minister of India
 Suresh Joachim, CEO WBBAS, No Poverty No Disease No War, World Peace Marathon and Suresh Joachim International Group Of Companies.
 Valiama Narain
 Ramamurthy Thyagarajan

Educators 
 L. S. Kandasamy, teacher at Tamil Nadu Agricultural University
Jeppiaar, founder, Sathyabama University
V. L. Ethiraj, founder, Ethiraj College for Women
Rajalakshmi Parthasarathy, founder, Padma Seshadri Bala Bhavan
B. S. Abdur Rahman, founder, B. S. Abdur Rahman University
Munirathna Anandakrishnan, former chairman, Indian Institute of Technology Kanpur and former Vice-Chancellor, Anna University
Bala V. Balachandran, founder, Dean & Chairman, Great Lakes Institute of Management
V. M. Muralidharan, former chairman, Ethiraj College for Women
Subra Suresh, President of Carnegie Mellon University, former Dean of the School of Engineering at the Massachusetts Institute of Technology, former Director of the National Science Foundation
Ramayya Krishnan, Dean of Heinz College and H. John Heinz III, W. W. Cooper and Ruth F. Cooper Professor of Management Science and Information Systems at Carnegie Mellon University

Philanthropists
 Annamalai Chettiar
 Pachaiyappa Mudaliar
 Chengalvaraya Naicker
 Kandasamy Kandar
Alagappa Chettiar
 T. M. Jambulingam Mudaliar

Diplomats
 Lakshman Kadirgamar, former Sri Lankan foreign minister and diplomat
 Gopalapuram Parthasarathy, diplomat and author in India
 Yogendra Duraiswamy, Sri Lankan diplomat
 Tamara Kunanayakam
 Arunachalam Mahadeva
 Anton Muttukumaru
 Manicasothy Saravanamuttu
 H. W. Thambiah
 Krishnan Srinivasan
 K. Raghunath
 Beno Zephine N L

Journalists and broadcasters
 J. S. Tissainayagam, journalist, first winner of the Peter Mackler Award for Courageous and Ethical Journalism
 George Alagiah, BBC reporter and journalist
 James Coomarasamy, BBC reporter and journalist
 Ranga Yogeshwar, Luxembourgish physicist and science journalist 
 Marc Fennell, Irish-Australian journalist, media personality, and author 
 Darshini David, BBC reporter and journalist
 Tim Kash, MTV and BBC reporter and journalist
 Taraki Sivaram, political analyst and a senior editor for Tamilnet.com
 E. Saravanapavan, managing director of the Uthayan and Sudar Oli Tamil newspapers
 N. Ram, editor-in-chief of The Hindu newspaper owned by Kasturi and Sons
 Cho Ramaswamy, editor of the Tamil political journal Tughlaq
 Thenkachi Ko. Swaminathan, deputy director of All India Radio, 'Indru oru thagaval Fame'
 Hari Sreenivasan, Public Broadcasting Service

Scientists 

 Mylswamy Annadurai, scientist with the Indian Space Research Organization; Director of ISRO Satellite Centre
 Shiva Ayyadurai, as a high school student in 1979, he developed an electronic version of an interoffice mail system, which he called "EMAIL" and copyrighted in 1982
Kailasavadivoo Sivan, current chairperson of Indian Space Research Organization.

Social anthropologists 
 Stanley Jeyaraja Tambiah

Academicians 
 Arumugam Vijiaratnam, became the first Pro-Chancellor of Nanyang Technological University in 1992 and served until 2005
 Bala V. Balachandran, founder and dean of Great Lakes Institute of Management, Chennai, India; professor at Northwestern University
 V. L. Ethiraj, founder of Ethiraj College for Women
 Malcolm Adiseshiah (1910–1994), economist; former Deputy Director General of UNESCO; founder of MIDS (Madras Institute of Development Studies)
 V. C. Kulandaiswamy, educator and technologist; formerly Vice Chancellor of Anna University, IGNOU and Tamil Virtual University
 M. Varadarasan, winner of sahitya Academy Award; Ex-Vice Chancellor of Madurai Kamaraj University
 Prof Philip Jeyaretnam, professor of law; member of Public Service Commission
 Prof Sittampalam Shanmugaratnam, former Head of the Department of Obstetrics & Gynaecology at the National University of Singapore
 Arjun Appadurai, contemporary social theorist; educator; founder of the School of International Relations, JNU, New Delhi
 Dr. H.S.S. Lawrence, educator; formerly Director of School Education, Tamil Nadu; UNESCO Expert to the Government of Afghanistan
 C. K. Prahalad, Professor of Corporate Strategy at the Ross School of Business of the University of Michigan
 Prof B.P. Sanjay, Vice-Chancellor of First Central University in Tamil Nadu at Tiruvaroor
 M. S. Ananth, Director of Indian Institute of Technology, Madras
 Xavier Thaninayagam, known for setting up the International Association for Tamil Research (IATR) and organising the first World Tamil Conference
 Christie Jayaratnam Eliezer, appointed a Member of the Order of Australia
 Sanjay Subrahmanyam, awarded the Infosys Prize in the field of humanities (history) in 2012
 Indira Samarasekera, 12th and current president and vice-chancellor of the University of Alberta
 Vilayanur S. Ramachandran, neuroscientist known primarily for his work in the fields of behavioral neurology and visual psychophysics

Agriculture 
 G. Nammalvar, Indian organic farming scientist
 M. S. Swaminathan, agricultural scientist and Ramon Magsaysay Awardee

Botanists 
 Ganapathi Thanikaimoni (1938–1986)
 M. O. P. Iyengar 
 Dr. C. Livingstone

Computer science 
 Ramanathan V. Guha, known for his work on Cyc, Schema.org, Meta Content Framework, Resource Description Framework; developed the first version of RSS 
 Madhu Sudan (1966–), professor at the Massachusetts Institute of Technology; member of MIT Computer Science and Artificial Intelligence Laboratory
 Hari Balakrishnan, professor at the Massachusetts Institute of Technology; member of MIT Computer Science and Artificial Intelligence Laboratory
 Arogyaswami Paulraj (1944–), Professor of Electrical Engineering at Stanford University; a pioneer of wireless smart antenna technology
 Shiva Ayyadurai
 Ravindran Kannan, a principal researcher at Microsoft Research India
 T. V. Raman
 Sundar Pichai, CEO of Google

Finance and economics 
 Marti Subrahmanyam, professor at New York University (NYU); on board of directors of Infosys and ICICI
 Bala V. Balachandran, professor at the Kellogg School of Management
 Ravi Jagannathan, economist and professor at the Kellogg School of Management
 H. V. R. Iyengar, ex-Governor of the Reserve Bank of India (1957–1962)
 S. Jagannathan, ex-Governor of the Reserve Bank of India (1970–1975); executive at the World Bank and International Monetary Fund (IMF)
 M. Narasimham, banker; ex-Governor of the Reserve Bank of India (1977); executive at the World Bank and IMF
 S. Venkitaramanan, ex-Governor of the Reserve Bank of India (1990–1992)
 K. Ramachandran, Director and CFO of Barclays Wealth, India (2008–)
 T. N. Srinivasan (1933–), economist; Samuel C. Park Jr. Professor of Economics at Yale University
 Raghuram Rajan, Professor at University of Chicago Booth School of Business, ex- Governor of Reserve Bank of India (2013–2016), Chief Economist, International Monetary Fund (IMF), (2003–2007)
 Sendhil Mullainathan, co-founder of Ideas-42
 Jomo Kwame Sundaram
 Ramon Navaratnam
 Raj Chetty, listed in 2008 by The Economist as one of the top eight young economists in the world
 Swaminathan Gurumurthy, Indian economist
 Arvind Subramanian, Indian Economist, Chief Economic Adviser to the Government of India (2014–2018)
 Krishnamurthy Subramanian, Indian Economist, Associate Professor in Indian School of Business and current Chief Economic Adviser to the Government of India (2018-)

Law 
 K. Sripavan, Chief Justice of Sri Lanka; former Deputy Solicitor General; judge and president of the Court of Appeal; Puisne Justice of the Supreme Court of Sri Lanka
 Rajesh Sreenivasan
 Karthy Govender, Commissioner of the South African Human Rights Commission; law professor at the University of Natal
 K. S. Rajah, former Supreme Court Judge – Singapore
 Navanethem Pillay, United Nations High Commissioner for Human Rights; South African of Indian origin and Tamil descent; first non-white woman on the High Court of South Africa; has served as a judge of the International Criminal Court and President of the International Criminal Tribunal for Rwanda
 M. Patanjali Sastri, Second Chief Justice of India 
 V. Bhashyam Aiyangar, lawyer and jurist
 A. Vaidyanatha Iyer(1890–1955), Tamil Indian activist; participated in the Indian independence movement and organized the temple entry movement in the Meenakshi Temple in Madurai; President of the Tamil Nadu Harijan Seva Sangh
 Mythili Raman, Tamil American lawyer; current acting Assistant Attorney General for the Criminal Division
 Sri Srinivasan, United States circuit judge of the United States Court of Appeals for the District of Columbia Circuit
 Muthucumaraswamy Sornarajah,  C. J. Koh Professor of Law at the National University of Singapore
 Malliha Wilson, Former Assistant Deputy Attorney General of the Government of Ontario

Mathematics  
 Srinivasa Ramanujan (1887–1920), known for his contributions to mathematical analysis, number theory, infinite series and continued fractions
 Swami Bharati Krishna Tirtha, known for his book Vedic Mathematics
 Ramachandran Balasubramanian, Indian number theorist; Director of the Institute of Mathematical Sciences in Chennai, India
 Subbayya Sivasankaranarayana Pillai (1901–1950), known for his work in number theory
 Kollagunta Gopalaiyer Ramanathan (1920–1992), known work in number theory
 Christie Jayaratnam Eliezer (1918–2001), mathematician and Tamil rights activist from Sri Lanka; recipient of the Order of Australia
 C. S. Seshadri, Director of the Chennai Mathematical Institute; Trieste awardee
 S. R. Srinivasa Varadhan, mathematician and fellow of the Royal Society, Abel Prize winner. Pioneer of LargeDeviations Theory.
 C. P. Ramanujam (1938–1974), worked on number theory and algebraic geometry
 T. S. Vijayaraghavan (1902–1955), worked on Pisot–Vijayaraghavan number
 Ravindran Kannan, Professor of Computer Science and Mathematics at Yale University; joint winner of the 1991 Fulkerson Prize in discrete mathematics for work on the volumes of convex bodies
 Kannan Soundararajan
 Ramaiyengar Sridharan
 Srinivasacharya Raghavan
 Madabusi Santanam Raghunathan
 A. A. Krishnaswami Ayyangar, exponent of Vedic mathematics
 Mudumbai Seshachalu Narasimhan, mathematician and fellow of the Royal Society (1996)
 K. R. Parthasarathy, Professor Emeritus at the Indian Statistical Institute of New Delhi
 Ramaiyengar Sridharan, mathematician at Chennai Mathematical Institute; awarded the Shanti Swarup Bhatnagar Prize for Science and Technology in Mathematical Science
 Raman Parimala, known for her contributions to algebra
 S. Ramanan, works in algebraic geometry
 Kavita Ramanan, daughter of S. Ramanan. Mathematician at Brown University

Medicine 
 Balamurali Ambati, world's youngest doctor at age 17
 Rangaswamy Srinivasan, ultraviolet excimer laser / LASIK inventor at IBM Research
 V. S. Ramachandran, neuroscientist; Director Professor at UC San Diego
 S. S. Ratnam, pioneer in Singapore in-vitro fertilisation; Sri Lankan Tamil ancestry
 Ganapathi Thanikaimoni, palynologist at French Institute of Pondicherry; awarded the Fyson Prize in Natural Science
 Govindappa Venkataswamy, founder of Aravind Eye Hospital
 Ravi Iyengar, professor and founder of the Iyengar Laboratory, Mount Sinai School of Medicine
 Gunamudian David Boaz, Indian Tamil psychologist
 Paul Kalanithi, Neurosurgeon
 Manoj Durairaj, Cardiac surgeon, philanthropist and winner of Pro Ecclesia et Pontifice
 Soumya Swaminathan, Chief Scientist of WHO
 Celine Gounder, is an American Tamil infectious disease physician, internist, epidemiologist, filmmaker, and medical journalist who specializes in infectious disease and global health
 Raghavan Varadarajan, Molecular Biologist At Indian Institute Of Science, Bangalore
 V. Shanta, Cancer Specialist Head Of Adyar Cancer Institute

Engineering (scientists) 
 Sir Chandrasekhara Venkata Raman, 1930 Nobel Prize Winner in physics
 Subrahmanyan Chandrasekhar, 1983 Nobel Prize Winner in physics
 Dr. K. Kasturirangan, former Chairman of ISRO; director of the National Institute of Advanced studies (NIAS)
 Raja Ramanna, former Chairman of Department of Atomic Energy; presided over India's first nuclear test in 1974
 Dr. P. K. Iyengar, former Chairman of Department of Atomic Energy
 M. R. Srinivasan, former Chairman of the Department of Atomic Energy
 R. Chidambaram, scientific adviser to the Prime Minister of India and ex-Chairman of Atomic Energy Commission
 S. R. Ranganathan, devised the five laws of library science
 A. Sivathanu Pillai, defence scientist; CEO of the Indo-Russian Brahmos company
 G. N. Ramachandran (1922–2001), made major contributions to biology and physics
 R. V. Perumal, former Director of the Liquid Propulsion Systems Centre
 Ramanuja Vijayaraghavan (1931–), physicist at the Tata Institute of Fundamental Research
 Udaya Kumar, designer of the Indian rupee sign
 Vallampadugai Srinivasa Raghavan Arunachalam
 Poondi Kumaraswamy, only person to have received both the Homi Bhabha Fellowship 1967–69 and the Jawaharlal Nehru Fellowship 1975–77, two of the country's top research awards; hydrologist
 P. S. Krishnaprasad, professor of electrical engineering at the University of Maryland
 S. Somasegar, recipient of the Asian American Engineer of the Year Award
 S. Vanajah, the only woman among four finalists who outlasted 11,000 other Malaysians who applied for the astronaut selection process in 2003
 Ramamurti Shankar, John Randolph Huffman Professor of Physics at Yale University
 B. C. Shekhar, modernised Malaysia's natural rubber industry
 Raman Sundrum, developed a class of models called the Randall–Sundrum models
 Siva Sivananthan, awarded the "Champion of Change" (Immigrant Entrepreneurs and Innovators category) by the White House

Zoologists 
 Mahadeva Subramania Mani, entomologist

Music

Tamil music 
 Muthu Thandavar, one of the Tamil Trinity
 Marimutthu Pillai, one of the Tamil Trinity
 Arunachala Kavi, one of the Tamil Trinity

 Kollangudi Karuppayee
 Nagore E. M. Hanifa

Carnatic music 
 Ranjani & Gayatri
 Papanasam Sivan
 Sikkil Gurucharan
 Lalgudi Jayaraman
 Kunnakudi Vaidyanathan
 Ariyakudi Ramanuja Iyengar
 T. M. Krishna
 Madurai Mani Iyer
 Veena Dhanammal
 E. Gayathri
 D. K. Pattammal
 Semmangudi Srinivasa Iyer
 Muthuswami Dikshitar
 N. Ramani
 L. Athira Krishna
 Aruna Sairam
 T. Brinda
 T. Muktha
 T. Viswanathan
 R. Vedavalli
 Sirkazhi Govindarajan
 Maharajapuram Santhanam
 Sanjay Subrahmanyan
 T. M. Krishna
 T. M. Soundararajan
 Nithyashree Mahadevan
 Nisha Rajagopalan
 Chinmayi
 Mahathi
 Aruna Sayeeram
 Alathur Brothers, Alathur Brothers Srinivasa Iyer (1912–1964) and Sivasubramania Iyer (1916–1980)
 Ariyakudi Ramanuja Iyengar
 Poochi Srinivasa Iyengar
 Patnam Subramania Iyer
 G. N. Balasubramaniam
 S. Sowmya
 M. L. Vasanthakumari
 Charumathi Ramachandran
 Vasundhara Devi
 Vyjayanthimala
 Abraham Pandithar, musicologist and siddha medicine practitioner from Madras Presidency, British India

Film music 
 K. V. Mahadevan (1918–2001), composer; winner of the National Film Award for Best Music Direction (1968 & 1980)
 T. K. Ramamoorthy (1922–2013), composer
 V. Kumar (1934–1996)
 Ilayaraja
 Gangai Amaran (1947–), composer, singer, director
 Chandrabose (?–2010), composer
 Shankar–Ganesh, composer
 Deva (1950–), composer, singer
 S. A. Rajkumar (1964–), composer
 Sirpy (1962–), composer
 A. R. Rahman (1967–), composer, singer, winner of Academy Award for Best Original Song, National Film Award for Best Music Direction (1993, 1997, 2002 & 2003)
 Yuvan Shankar Raja (1979–), composer, singer, winner of Cyprus International Film Festival Award in 2006 for Raam
 Harris Jayaraj (1975–), composer
 Kavita Krishnamurti (1958–), singer
 D. Imman (1983–), composer, singer
 Srikanth Deva, composer, singer
 Bobo Shashi, composer, singer
 Karthik Raja (1973–), composer
 Bharadwaj (1960–), composer, singer
 G. V. Prakash Kumar (1987–), composer, singer, actor
 Vijay Antony (1975–), composer, singer, actor
 Anirudh Ravichander (1990–), composer, singer
 James Vasanthan, composer
 Santhosh Narayanan (1983–), composer
 Mohamaad Ghibran (1980–), composer
 Joshua Sridhar (2004–), composer
 Nivas K. Prasanna (2014–), composer

Western music 

 Master Dhanraj, Mentor of Ilaiyaraaja and A. R. Rahman
 Guy Sebastian, Malaysian-Australian singer and songwriter 
 M.I.A. (Mathangi "Maya" Arulpragasam), British musician
 Sketchy Bongo (Yuvir Pillay), South African musician and DJ
 Clarence Jey (Clarence Jeyaretnam), Sri Lankan American record producer
 Yogi B (Yogeswaran Veerasingam), Malaysian hiphop artist, founder of Poetic Ammo
 Kamahl (Kandiah Kamalesvaran), Australian cabaret/easy listening singer
 Tharini Mudaliar, Australian singer and violinist
 Tommy Genesis, Canadian rapper
 Shan Vincent de Paul, Canadian singer-songwriter, Rapper
 Jacintha Abisheganaden, Singaporean singer
 Rudra, Singaporean death metal band
 Shruti Haasan, western singer, daughter of Tamil actor Kamal Haasan
 Blaaze, rap artist and playback singer
 Lord Kossity
 Siva Kaneswaran, band member of The Wanted
 Arjun Coomaraswamy, UK R&B singer
 Dinesh Kanagaratnam, Sri Lankan hiphop artist
 Hiphop Tamizha, Tamil rap duo
 Vidya Vox, American singer
 Yanchan, Canadian music artist
 Priya Ragu, Swiss singer

Other 
 Jaclyn Victor, Malaysian singer, winner of inaugural Malaysian Idol
 Chen Gexin, Chinese songwriter 
 Chen Gang, Chinese composer
 Lydian Nadhaswaram, child prodigy, Indian pianist, winner of The World's Best, 2019
 Ashan Pillai, Sri Lankan born British violist and professor

Dance 
 T. Balasaraswati
 Chitra Visweswaran
 Padma Subramanyam
 Rukmini Devi Arundale
 Anita Ratnam
 Vyjayanthimala
 Rajee Narayan

Cinema

Directors

Actors 

Gemini Ganesan
Kamal Haasan  
Suriya
Silambarasan 
Vijay
R. Madhavan
Saravanan
Sivaji Ganesan
Arun Vijay
Vijayakanth 
Harish Kalyan
Siddharth
Karthi
Vijay Sethupathi
Sivakarthikeyan
Vadivelu
Goundamani
Senthil
Ramarajan
Vivek
Santhanam
Sathyaraj
Sathish
Sibi Sathyaraj
Vikram
M. K. Thyagaraja Bhagavathar
N. S. Krishnan
P. U. Chinnappa
T. R. Mahalingam
Yogi Babu
Manivannan
Thengai Srinivasan
Manobala
Mansoor Ali Khan
Vennira Aadai Moorthy
Karunas
Delhi Ganesh
Singamuthu
Kumarimuthu
Vinu Chakravarthy
Vijay Antony
G. V. Prakash Kumar
T. Rajendar
Sam Anderson 
Jayam Ravi, half Tamil
Prashanth Thyagarajan, half Tamil

Actresses 

Trisha (actress)
Nivetha Pethuraj
Shruti Haasan, half Tamil
Menaka (actress)
Keerthy Suresh, half Tamil
Priya Anand, half Tamil
Regina Cassandra
Priyamani
Rekha, half Tamil
Meena, half Tamil
Sridevi, half Tamil
Priya Bhavani Shankar
Vyjanthimala
Madhoo
Meenakshi Seshadri
Vidya Balan, half Tamil
Riythvika
Suhasini Maniratnam
Hema Malini
Esha Deol, half Tamil
Priyanka Arul Mohan, half Tamil
Indhuja Ravichandran
Janani (actress)
Amritha Aiyer
Ramya Krishnan
Sai Dhanshika

Music composers 
See: Film music

A. R. Rahman
Yuvan Shankar Raja
Ilaiyaraaja
Harris Jayaraj
D. Imman
Ghibran
Vivek-Mervin
Anirudh Ravichander
Justin Prabhakaran
Santhosh Narayanan
Gangai Amaran
Deva (composer)
Sam C. S.
Vijay Antony
G. V. Prakash Kumar
Darbuka Siva
Sean Roldan

 In Hollywood 
 Sendhil Ramamurthy, actor in NBC drama Heroes and Netflix series Never Have I Ever; half Tamil 
 Ashok Amritraj, filmmaker, producer
 Merle Oberon, actress
 Geraldine Viswanathan, actress from Blockers (film); half Tamil
 Sunkrish Bala, actor in ABC show Notes from the Underbelly Mindy Kaling, actor in NBC sitcom The Office; half Tamil
 Aziz Ansari, actor and comedian
 Poorna Jagannathan, actress in Netflix series Never Have I Ever
 Chandran Rutnam, award-winning director for the movie A Common Man at the Madrid International Film Festival; half Tamil.
 M. Night Shyamalan, director; half Tamil
 Maitreyi Ramakrishnan, actress in Netflix series Never Have I Ever
 Selva Rasalingam, actor; half Tamil
 Nimmi Harasgama, actress in Funny Boy (2020 film); half Tamil
 Amara Karan, actress in The Darjeeling Limited
 Simone Ashley, actress in Bridgerton
 Charithra Chandran, actress in Bridgerton

 Other entertainers 
 Padma Lakshmi, American model and television host
 Amelia Henderson, British-Malaysian media personality 
 Anjana Vasan, British-Singaporean actress
 Law Lan, Hong Kong actress
 Cassandra Ponti, Filipino actress 
 Tatiana Kumar, French-Malaysian model 
 Huzir Sulaiman, Malaysian director and actor 
 Waheeda Rehman, Indian actress and dancer
 Michelle Saram, Chinese-Singaporean actress and singer
 Romesh Ranganathan, British comedian
 Sindhu Vee, British stand-up comedian; half Tamil
 Aurore Kichenin, French model
 Deborah Priya Henry, Malaysian-Irish model and television personality

 Sports and games 

 Athletics 

 Mariyappan Thangavelu, winner of the gold medal in Paralympics, high jump
 Santhi Soundarajan, first World Peace Sports Festival Ambassador from India; first Tamil woman to win a medal at Asian Games
 Mani Jegathesan
 Sathish Sivalingam
 Gomathi Marimuthu, winner of the gold medal in Asian athletics championship

 Basketball 
 Anitha Pauldurai, basketball player

 Boxing
 Venkatesan Devarajan was the second Indian to win a medal at the Boxing World Cup after Pu Zoramthanga (boxer), from Mizoram. He is from Chennai, India. He was awarded the Arjuna Award in 1995. He competed in the men's bantamweight event at the 1992 Summer Olympics. V. Devarajan has been a fighter on and off the boxing ring. He broke new ground by becoming the first Indian to win a World Cup medal on foreign soil in 1994. 
 Kalaivani Srinivasan is a female boxer from Tamil Nadu who won a silver medal at the Indian Seniors National Boxing Championship in Vijayanagar in 2019. She was named the ‘Most Promising Boxer’ at the Indian National Boxing Championship in 2019. She later won a gold medal at the South Asian Games in Kathmandu, Nepal in 2019.

 Carrom 
 A. Maria Irudayam, world carrom champion and Arjuna Award winner for carrom (1996)
 R. Arokiaraj, carrom champion
 B. Radhakrishnan, carrom champion

 Volleyball 
 A. Palanisamy, first Arjuna Award winner for volleyball (1961)
 G. E. Sridharan, Arjuna Award winner
 Kumaran, played for Indian team and currently playing for IOB, Chennai
 Sivabalan, played for India and currently playing for IOB, Chennai

 Chess 
 Viswanathan Anand, world chess champion; first Indian to earn the title of Grandmaster
 Manuel Aaron, first Indian to earn the title of International Master
 Murugan Thiruchelvam, chess player from United Kingdom
 Krishnan Sasikiran, Grandmaster and Arjuna Award winner for chess (2002)
 S. Vijayalakshmi, six-time women's national champion of India; first woman Grandmaster from India; Arjuna Award winner for chess (2000)
 Aarthie Ramaswamy, woman Grandmaster and under-18 girls' world chess champion
 Baskaran Adhiban, chess Grandmaster from Tamil Nadu
 S. P. Sethuraman, chess Grandmaster from Tamil Nadu
 Srinath Narayanan, Chess Grandmaster From Tamil Nadu
 Rameshbabu Praggnanandhaa, Chess Grandmaster From Tamil Nadu

 Cricket 

 India 
 M.J. Gopalan (1909–2003), represented India in both international field hockey and cricket
 C. R. Rangachari (1916–1993), pace bowler, Indian Cricket Team
 M. Suryanarayan (1930–2010), batsman, Indian Test cricketer
 C. D. Gopinath (1930–), batsman, Indian Cricket Team
 Ravichandran Ashwin, all rounder, Indian Cricket Team
 S. Venkataraghavan (1945–), ex-Captain of Indian Cricket Team and Test and ODI umpire
 K. Srikkanth (1959–), ex-Captain and current Chief Selector of Indian Cricket Team
 T. A. Sekhar (1956–), pace bowler, Indian Cricket Team
 Thiru Kumaran (1975–), pace bowler, Indian Cricket Team
 T.E. Srinivasan, batsman, Indian Cricket Team
 L. Sivaramakrishnan (1965–), spin bowler, Indian Cricket Team
 Margasahayam Venkataramana (1966–), test cricketer, off-spinner
 V. B. Chandrasekhar, batsman, Indian Cricket Team
 Bharat Arun (1962–), pace bowler, Indian Cricket Team
 Murali Kartik (1976–), spin bowler, Indian Cricket Team, Kolkata Knight Riders, Pune Warriors
 Sadagoppan Ramesh (1975–), batsman, Indian Cricket Team
 Subramaniam Badrinath (1980–), batsman, Indian Cricket Team, Chennai Super Kings
 Murali Vijay (1984–), batsman, Indian Cricket Team, Chennai Super Kings
 Lakshmipathy Balaji (1981–), pace bowler, Indian Cricket Team, Chennai Super Kings, Kolkata Knight Riders
 Dinesh Karthik (1985–), wicketkeeper, Indian Cricket Team, Delhi Daredevils, Kings XI Punjab, Mumbai Indians
 Washington Sundar (1999–), all-rounder, Indian Cricket Team, Royal Challengers Bangalore
 Thangarasu Natarajan, pacer From Salem Tamil Nadu
 Varun Chakravarthy, spinner 
 Murugan Ashwin, leg spinner

 Other countries 
 Muttiah Muralitharan (1972–), highest wicket taker in test and ODI cricket from Sri Lanka
 Angelo Mathews, Sri Lankan all rounder and captain
 Russel Arnold, Sri Lankan cricketer and journalist
 Roy Dias, former Sri Lankan test cricketer/vice captain; a Tamil of Negombo Chetty
 Sridharan Jeganathan (?–1996), former NCC and Sri Lankan test cricketer/off spin bowler; first Sri Lankan test cricketer to die
 Vinodhan John, pace bowler, first Sri Lankan Tamil Test cricketer 1982
 Pradeep Jayaprakashdaran, Sri Lankan One Day International (ODI) cricket player
 S. Illangaratnam, Sri Lankan cricketer, stalwart of Moratuwa and Bloomfield cricket clubs prior to the Test era
 Mahadevan Sathasivam, one of the best cricket batsmen produced by Ceylon
 Kandiah Thirugnansampandapillai Francis, international Test and ODI umpire from Sri Lanka
 Nasser Hussain (1968–), former Essex and England cricketer, test captain
 Sanjayan Thuraisingam (1969–), pace bowler, Canadian Cricket Team
 Alvin Kallicharan, former West Indies Guyana cricket captain
 Mahendra Nagamootoo, former West Indies and Guyana cricketer, nephew of Alvin Kallicharan
 Veerasammy Permaul, West Indies and Guyana cricketer

 Football 
 Peter Velappan (1935–2018), General Secretary of Asian Football Confederation; member of FIFA Strategic Studies Committee & Organising Committee for the FIFA World Cup
 Samuel Moutoussamy Professional footballer who plays as a midfielder for FC Nantes and represents the DR Congo internationally.
 Gurusamy Kandasamy
 Syed Sabir Pasha, represented Indian football team in the early 1990s; also played for and coached Indian Bank-Chennai

 Hockey 
 Vasudevan Baskaran, captain of the Indian hockey team that won Olympic Gold in 1980 Moscow Olympics; Arjuna Award winner (1979–1980)
 Dhanraj Pillay (1968–), ex-Indian hockey team Captain, Arjuna Award winner (1995); winner of Rajiv Gandhi Khel Ratna Award (1999–2000)
 Adam Sinclair, member of the Indian hockey team at the 2004 Athens Olympics

 Mountain climbing 
 M. Magendran, conquered the highest peak in the world, Mount Everest

 Racing 
 Karun Chandhok, Formula 1 driver
 Naren Kumar, four time National Rally Champion
 Ajith Kumar, mechanic, F2 racer, Moto gp racer

 Squash 
 Nicol David, former world number 1
 Joshna Chinappa, Indian women Squash Champion

 Tennis 
 Vijay Amritraj, international champion and actor
 Anand Amritraj, international player
 Ashok Amritraj, international player
 Prakash Amritraj, international player
 Ramanathan Krishnan, international player
 Ramesh Krishnan, international player
 Nirupama Vaidyanathan, international player

 Entertainers 
 Vyjayanthimala, Bharatanatyam dancer; introduced semi-classical dance in Bollywood
 Rukmini Devi Arundale, Bharatanatyam dancer; founder of Kalakshetra
 Balasaraswati, Bharatanatyam dancer
 Alarmel Valli, Bharatanatyam dancer
 Chitra Visweswaran, Bharatanatyam dancer
 Padma Subramanyam, Bharatanatyam dancer
 Pithukuli Murugadas, musician
 K. B. Sundarambal, actress andsinger
 Sirkazhi Govindarajan, vocalist and Carnatic music exponent
 Dr.Sirkazhi G. Sivachidambaram, vocalist and Carnatic music exponent

 Religion and spirituality 
 Bodhidharma (5th/6th century), Buddhist monk and 28th patriarch of Buddhism; traditionally credited as the leading patriarch and transmitter of Zen to China; spread Shaolin Kung Fu in China
 Ayya Vaikundar (1809–1851), founder and preceptor of the Ayyavazhi sect
 Ramalinga Swamigal (1823–1873), popularly known as Vallalar
 Ramanuja (1017–1137), philosopher and saint of Vaishnavism
 Iyothee Thass, Buddhist philosopher and activist

 Tamil literature 

 Classical literature 
 Tholkappiar, author of the Tholkappiyam Thiruvalluvar, poet and author of the Tirukkuṛaḷ Tirumular, poet and author of Tirumantiram Kambar, author of Ramavataram Avvaiyar, author of Ātticcūṭi Eelattu Poothanthevanar, classical Sri Lankan poet of the Sangam period

 Spiritual literature 

 Murugan 
 Nakkeerar author of Tirumurukāṟṟuppaṭai Arunagirinathar, author of Thiruppugazh Shaivism 
 Sekkizhar, author of Periapuranam Manikkavasagar, author of Thiruvasagam and one of the Nayanmars
 Siva prakasar, author of Nanneri Thirumular, author of Thirumandhiram Vaishnavism 
 Nammalvar, author of Tiruvaymoli and one of the Alwars
 Thirumazhisai Alvar, author of Tiruchanda-virutham and one of the Alwars
 Andal, author of Tiruppaavai and one of the Alwars
 V. Akilesapillai, scholar, poet and author of Thirukonasala Vaipavam from Sri Lanka

 Islam 
 Umaru Pulavar (1605–1703), author of Seerappuranam, Islamic tamil poet.

Jain
 Illango Adigal, poet and author of Silappathikaram Tirutakakatevar, author of Jivaka Chintamani Mandalapuruder, author of Vira Mandalaver is Sudamani Nigandhu''
 Svarupananda Desikar

Modern literature

India 
 Subramania Bharati, social and literary writer
 Bharathidasan (1891–1964), poet and rationalist
 Pattukkottai Kalyanasundaram, wrote revolutionary Tamil poems in common language
 Pudhumaipithan (1906–1948), fiction writer
 Samuel Vedanayagam Pillai, first Tamil novelist
 Akilan, novelist
 Ramalingam Pillai
 Thi. Janakiraman, novelist
 Mahavidwan Vasudeva Mudaliar, scholar
 Kalki Krishnamurthy (1899–1954), novelist and journalist
 Jayakanthan (1934–2015), writer and novelist
 G. P. Rajarathnam (1909–1979), Tamil-born Kannada poet and writer
 T. P. Kailasam (1884–1946), playwright and writer in Kannada literature from Karnataka
 Masti Venkatesha Iyengar (1891–1986), Kannada writer and recipient of Jnanpith Award
 Kannadasan (1927–1981), popularly called as Kavi Arasu; poet and film lyricist; winner of National Film Award for Best Lyrics (1969)
 Vairamuthu (1953–), poet and film lyricist; winner of National Film Award for Best Lyrics (1986, 1993, 1995, 2000, and 2003)
 Leena Manimekalai
 Indira Soundarajan, novelist and short story writer
 Ashoka Mitran (1931–2017), novelist and short story writer
 R. K. Narayan (1906–2001), English novelist and essayist
 Makaral Karthikeya Mudaliar, scholar
 Pa. Subramania Mudaliar, scholar
 Varadarasanar, novelist
 Sandilyan, novelist
 Pa. Vijay, film lyricist; winner of National Film Award for Best Lyrics (2005)
 Vaali, film lyricist
 Sujatha (1935–2008), novelist, haiku poet, film screenplay writer
 R. Raghava Iyengar
 K. S. Maniam
 Kavikko Abdul Rahman
 Makkal Pavalar Inqulab, left-leaning poet
 Mu. Metha
 Ka. Mu. Sheriff, film lyricist
 Manushyaputhiran
 Rajathi Salma, novelist
Balakumaran (5 July 1946 – 15 May 2018)[1], Indian Tamil writer, author of over 200 novels, 100 short stories, etc.
Pattukkottai Prabakar, Indian Tamil writer. He is a king of crime and thrill novels and also a versatile writer.
Rajesh Kumar (writer), pseudonym of KR Rajagopal, Tamil author of crime fiction. Kalaimaamani Awardee.

Other countries 
 Ronnie Govender, South African playwright, actor, activist, won the 1997 Commonwealth Writers' Prize
 Pico Iyer, British-Japanese essayist and novelist
 Kessie Govender, South African playwright, actor and theatre director; founded the Stable Theatre
 Kandappu Murugesu, Sri Lankan poet
 Shyam Selvadurai, Sri Lankan-Canadian novelist; half Tamil
 Sharon Bala, Canadian writer
 Akwaeke Emezi, Nigerian writer and video artist; half Tamil
 Rani Manicka, Malaysian novelist, won the Commonwealth Writers' Prize in 2003 for South East Asia and South Pacific region
 Edwin Thumboo, Singaporean writer; half Tamil
 T. K. Doraiswamy (Nakulan) (1921–2007), poet, novelist, translator, professor of English Singapore writer; President of Singapore Law Society
 Gopal Baratham (1935–2002), Singaporean writer and neurosurgeon

Others

 Arumuka Navalar (1822–1879), pioneer of Tamil prose; champion of Hinduism from Jaffna, Sri Lanka
 Siva prakasar, Saiva Siddantha, scholar, wrote 32 books in Tamil (Nanneri, Thiruchendur ula)
 Maraimalai Adigal, scholar and activist
 U. V. Swaminatha Iyer (1855–1942)
 Paventhar Bharathidasan, poet, also known as "Puratchi Kavignar"
 Kalyanasundara Mudaliar, writer
 Varadarasanar, novelist
 Erode Tamilanban, poet
 Solomon Pappaiah, scholar and debate judge
 Pudhumaipithan, revolutionary writer from the Tirunelveli Saiva Pillai community
 Jayakanthan, writer
 Kavimani Desigavinayagam Pillai, poet
 Manonmaniam Sundaram Pillai, writer 
 Perumal Rasu, writer, poet, painter
 Ramanuja Kavirayar, poet

Modern art 
 S. Chandrasekaran, nominated for the APBF Signature Art Prize 2008 as one of the top ten
 Vivian Sundaram, Indian Jewish contemporary artist
 Manohar Devadoss, 2020 Padma Shri recipient

See also 
 Tamil people
 Tamil diaspora
 List of Sri Lankan Tamils
 Tamil Canadian
 Tamil American
 Tamil Malaysians
 British Tamil
 Tamil Australian
 Tamil Indonesians
 Tamil South Africans
 Tamil Germans
 Tamils in France
 Tamil Mauritian

References 

Tamils
 List